Crowders Mountain is one of two main peaks within Crowders Mountain State Park, the other peak being The Pinnacle.

Although stated as true on some sites, the mountain was not named after Ulrich Crowder [Krauter], a German merchant and farmer. In 1789, Ulrich purchased land much farther north of the mountain before moving west. The mountain is named for Crowders Creek, which originates near the base of the mountain. The original namesake of Crowders Creek is unknown, but mostly likely lived farther south along Crowders Creek. Crowders Mountain and The Pinnacle, located to the southwest, once served as markers to separate the hunting grounds of the Catawba and Cherokee peoples.

In the early 1970s a mining company began doing exploratory sampling of areas along what is now the Backside Trail with the intent of purchasing the minerals rights to excavate the mountain for kyanite, barite, and iron. This led local concerned citizens, educational institutions, and local governments to join together and convince state government pursue the creation of a state park in order to protect the area.

In 1973 the State of North Carolina created Crowders Mountain State Park. It opened to the public in 1974. Crowders Mountain proper was added to the new park in 1978. The Pinnacle was added in 1987. In the year 2000, 2000+ acres were purchased. This purchase brought the entire ridge line of Kings Mountain into the park and  took park boundaries to the North Carolina/South Carolina state line. The cliffs of Crowders Mountain are popular among rock climbers. Rock climbing is no longer permitted on The Pinnacle. Hiking trails lead to both summits, from which it is possible to view the skyscrapers of nearby Charlotte, North Carolina, on a clear day.

Communications center

One of the first FM radio stations in North Carolina, Gastonia's WGNC-FM, erected a transmission tower on Crowders Mountain in the late 1940s. Today three radio towers are located on the mountain. The transmitters are located within a  plot of land on the summit that remains privately owned. In addition to commercial radio, the towers relay signals for wireless phone companies, railroads and local emergency services.

On June 19, 2007, the Gastonia City Council denied a request to add  to a  communications tower on Crowders Mountain. Crown Castle International had requested the change to allow the signal of a Spanish-language radio station in Gaffney, South Carolina, to reach Charlotte.

The council cited concerns that the taller tower would damage views of the mountain and that construction equipment would harm the mountain's environment.

The tallest tower on the mountain is owned by CBS Communications and rises .

References
 Walter C Biggs and James F. Parnell (1989). State Parks of North Carolina. John F. Blair, Publisher.
 George, Jefferson. (2007, June 18). "Tower struggle: Antenna request latest battle for those fighting to minimize park intrusions". The Charlotte Observer.
 George, Jefferson. (2007, June 20). "Taller tower atop Crowders Mtn. axed: Council votes against extension, says it wants to protect state park". The Charlotte Observer.

External links
 Crowders Mountain State Park website

Protected areas of Gaston County, North Carolina
Mountains of North Carolina
Inselbergs of Piedmont (United States)
Landforms of Gaston County, North Carolina